The Avions Fairey Junior, also known as the Tipsy Junior was a single-seat light aircraft built in Belgium following World War II.

Development
The Junior was one of a series of light aircraft designed by and named after E.O.Tips of Fairey Aviation's Belgian subsidiary, Avions Fairey. Of wood and fabric construction, it was a conventional, low-wing monoplane with a tailwheel undercarriage and a single seat, open cockpit, though there was the option of a bubble hood. The constant chord wings were almost square ended and the tailplane, fin and rudder also angular. Both completed aircraft were initially powered by the 36 hp (27 kW) Aeronca JAP J-99  engine, later replaced by the more powerful, 62 hp (46 kW) Walter Mikron 2.

The Junior, registered OO-TIT, flew for the first time on 30 June 1947 from Gosselies in Belgium.

Operational history

The first Junior was written off after a hard landing in 1948.

The second example (construction number J.111, registration OO-ULA) was bought by Fairey and taken to England in 1953, where it was registered as G-AMVP. In 1957, it was used in a publicity stunt when Fairey test pilot Peter Twiss landed it on the aircraft carrier HMS Ark Royal.  For part of its time it had the bubble canopy.  Rebuilt after a long time in storage following a forced landing in 1993, it flew again late in 2006.  It had a minor landing accident in 2008 but had a permit to fly until May 2009.

The Junior did not sell, and the third airframe was cancelled before completion.
It was purchased incomplete by Fairey in 1961 and has been under construction in the hands of a number of owners in the intervening years, but never finished.

Specifications

References

Bibliography

 
 
 
 

1940s Belgian sport aircraft
Junior
Low-wing aircraft
Single-engined tractor aircraft
Aircraft first flown in 1947